Gwen Bagni (January 24, 1913 – May 13, 2001) was an American screenwriter and TV writer. She worked on Backstairs at the White House and Four Star Playhouse. She worked with her first husband actor/writer John Bagni, who died in 1954. Their collaborations included scripts for Douglas Fairbanks Presents. She also wrote screenplays with her second husband, the actor Paul Dubov, whom she married in 1963.

Filmography

Films

Television

References

External links

1913 births
2001 deaths
Screenwriters from California
People from Glendale, California
American women screenwriters
20th-century American women writers
20th-century American screenwriters